Antarctic gyre may refer to any of the three ocean currents and gyres within the Southern Ocean:
 Antarctic Circumpolar Current, an ocean current circulating around Antarctica
 Ross Gyre, an oceanic gyre in the Ross Sea
 Weddell Gyre, an oceanic gyre in the Weddell Sea